Orem High School is a high school in Orem, Utah, part of the Alpine School District. It was originally built in 1956, and has since undergone major renovations. The old school building was torn down and a replacement was built in what was the former building's parking lot, in 2010.

Notable alumni
 Tyson Apostol, professional cyclist and Survivor contestant
 Kurt Bestor, composer and musician
 Gary Crowton, American football coach
 Matt Gay, American football player
 Gary Herbert, governor of Utah
 Chad Lewis, American football player
 Noah Sewell, American football player

References

External links

 
 Alpine School District

Public high schools in Utah
Educational institutions established in 1956
Schools in Utah County, Utah
1956 establishments in Utah
Buildings and structures in Orem, Utah